Olympia Larissa B.C. (alternate spellings: Olimpia, Larissas, Larisa, Larisas) (Greek: Ολύμπια Λάρισας) was a Greek professional basketball club, based in Larissa, Greece. The club's full name was Olympia Larissa Basketball Club. It was founded in 1979, making it one of the youngest sports clubs in Greece. Its colors were orange and blue. Olympia Larissa's home arena was the Larissa Neapolis Arena.

The most notable Greek players that played for the club include: Georgios Printezis, Dimos Dikoudis, and Nikos Oikonomou.

History
Olympia Larissa B.C. is a team that ascended in the mid to late 2000s, as a team primarily composed of young players on the rise, with a promising future. During the 2006–07 season, Olympia Larissa placed 7th in the Greek League regular season, and qualified to the Greek League playoffs for the first time, with core leaders such as former University of Florida standout Matt Walsh, 2007 NBA Draft second round draft pick Georgios Printezis, Georgios Tsiaras, and head coach Georgios Bartzokas.

In the 2007–08 season of the Greek League, Olympia qualified for the playoffs for the second consecutive year, after placing 8th in the regular season standings. In the 2007–08 season of the EuroChallenge, the team reached the Top 16 stage of the competition, and that same season in the Greek Cup, the club reached the quarterfinals.

In 2009, Olympia Larissa merged with AEL 1964, under the name G.S. Olympia Larissas. After a year, the club was relegated.

Notable players

  Marios Batis
  Kostas Charalampidis
  Dimos Dikoudis
  Sotiris Gioulekas
  Nikos Kaklamanos
  Fanis Koumpouras
  Nikos Oikonomou
  Pantelis Papaioakeim
  Spiros Papavasileiou
  Georgios Printezis
  Kostas Totsios
  Georgios Tsiaras

Europe:
  Stephen Arigbabu
  Steve Hansell
  Vladimir Krstić
  Māris Ļaksa
 - Franko Nakić
  Aleksandar Radojević
  Sven Schultze

USA:
  Erick Barkley
  Doremus Bennerman
  Corey Belser
  James Forrest
  Tyrone Grant
  Michael Antonio "Mike" King
  Chris Massie
  Tyrone Nesby
  Matt Walsh

Head coaches

Women's team
The club's women's basketball section, compete in the 2015-16 season of the Greek Women's basketball second national tier, the A2 women's league.

References

External links
Eurobasket.com Team Profile
Olympia B.C. Channel

Basketball teams established in 1979
Basketball teams in Greece
Sport in Larissa